I-75, later I-175, was an Imperial Japanese Navy Kaidai-type cruiser submarine of the KD6B sub-class commissioned in 1938. During World War II, she took part in the attack on Pearl Harbor, the Battle of Midway, the Guadalcanal campaign, the Aleutian Islands campaign, and the Gilbert and Marshall Islands campaign and operated off Australia, before she was sunk in 1944 during her tenth war patrol. She is best known for sinking the United States Navy escort carrier  on 24 November 1943.

Design and description
The submarines of the KD6B sub-class were very similar to the preceding KD6A sub-class. They displaced  surfaced and  submerged. They had a diving depth of 

For surface running, the submarines were powered by two  diesel engines, each driving one propeller shaft. When submerged each propeller was driven by a  electric motor. They could reach  on the surface and  underwater.

The submarines were armed with six internal  torpedo tubes, four in the bow and two in the stern. They carried a total of 14 torpedoes. They also were armed with one  deck gun and two Hotchkiss M1929  anti-aircraft machine guns.

Construction and commissioning
I-75 was laid down on 1 November 1934 by Mitsubishi in Kobe, Japan. Launched on 16 September 1937, she was completed and commissioned on 18 December 1938.

Service history

Pre-World War II
On the day of her commissioning, I-75 was attached to the Kure Naval District and assigned to Submarine Division 11 in Submarine Squadron 2 in the 2nd Fleet, a component of the Combined Fleet. On 15 November 1939, her division was transferred to Submarine Squadron 3, also in the 2nd Fleet. I-75 departed Okinawa on 27 March 1940 in company with the submarines I-68, I-69, and I-74 for a training cruise in southern Chinese waters, completing it when the six submarines arrived at Takao, Formosa, on 2 April 1940. On 11 October 1940, I-75 was one of 98 Imperial Japanese Navy ships that gathered along with more than 500 aircraft on the Japanese coast at Yokohama Bay for an Imperial fleet review — the largest fleet review in Japanese history — in honor of the 2,600th anniversary of the enthronement of the Emperor Jimmu, Japan's legendary first emperor. On 15 November 1940, Submarine Squadron 3 was reassigned to the 6th Fleet, a component of the Combined Fleet.

On 11 November 1941, the 6th Fleet's commander, Vice Admiral Mitsumi Shimizu, held a meeting with the commanding officers of the submarines of Submarine Squadron 3 aboard his flagship, the light cruiser , and his chief of staff briefed them on plans for Operation Z, the upcoming surprise attack on Pearl Harbor in Hawaii. The attack would begin the Pacific campaign and bring Japan and the United States into World War II.

As Japanese military forces began to deploy for the opening Japanese offensive of the war, I-75 was assigned to the Submarine Advance Force on 11 November 1941 and departed Saeki Bay on the coast of Kyushu that day in company with I-74 bound for Kwajalein Atoll, which the two submarines reached on 20 November 1941. Assigned to support Operation Z, I-75 got underway from Kwajalein on 23 November 1941 and set course for the Hawaiian Islands. While she was en route, she received the message "Climb Mount Niitaka 1208" from the Combined Fleet on 2 December 1941, indicating that war with the Allies would commence on 8 December 1941 Japan time, which was on 7 December 1941 on the other side of the International Date Line in Hawaii.

World War II

First war patrol
When the attack on Pearl Harbor took place on the morning of 7 December 1941, the submarines of Submarine Squadron 3 were deployed south of Oahu, with orders to reconnoiter the area and attack any ships that sortied from Pear Harbor.

I-75 bombarded the harbor at Kahului on the north coast of Maui on 15 December 1941. She fired 16 rounds from her  deck gun. Two shells struck the Maui Pineapple Company cannery, which sustained an estimated US$654.38 in damage.

On 17 December 1941, I-75 hit the American 3,253- or 3,545-gross register ton (according to different sources) merchant ship Manini with one torpedo either  (according to different sources) south of Hawaii, then surfaced and illuminated Manini with a searchlight. The United States Navy destroyer  rescued Manini′s survivors on 28 December 1941.

I-75 departed the Hawaiian Islands area and on 24 December 1941 bombarded Naval Air Station Palmyra on Palmyra Atoll in the northern Line Islands. Opening fire at 04:55 Greenwich Civil Time, she fired twelve  rounds, targeting the atoll′s radio station, and with one of the shells hit the United States Army Corps of Engineers dredge Sacramento, which was anchored in the lagoon. A  coastal artillery battery on the atoll returned fire, forcing her to submerge and withdraw. She arrived at Kwajalein on 31 December 1941.

January–April 1942

I-75 and I-74 got underway from Kwajalein on 13 January 1942 and headed north, passing Midway Atoll in the Northwestern Hawaiian Islands on their way to the Aleutian Islands. From the Aleutians, the two submarines made their way to Yokosuka, Japan, where they arrived on 19 February 1942.

Second war patrol
I-75′s stay in Japan ended on 15 April 1942, when she began her second war patrol, departing Kure in company with I-74 to form a patrol line east of Japan. While she was at sea, 16 United States Army Air Forces B-25 Mitchell bombers launched by the aircraft carrier  struck targets on Honshu in the Doolittle Raid on 18 April 1942, but I-75 made no contact with enemy forces. I-75 and I-74 concluded their patrol with their arrival at Kwajalein on 10 May 1942.

Third war patrol: Midway operation
On 20 May 1942, I-75 was renumbered I-175 and I-74 became I-174. The two submarines departed Kwajalein in company that day to participate in Operation MI, the planned Japanese invasion of Midway Atoll. The aircraft were scheduled to arrive at the French Frigate Shoals on 30 May 1942 and make their Pearl Harbor flight on 31 May. When I-123 arrived off the French Frigate Shoals on 29 May 1942, however, she found the U.S. Navy seaplane tenders  and  already operating flying boats there. She radioed her news of this sighting after she surfaced that night, and the reconnaissance flight was postponed for a day. When I-123 again observed the French Frigate Shoals on 31 May, she found the American ships still there and noted U.S. Navy flying boats landing in the lagoon, and this news resulted in the Japanese concluding that the U.S. Navy was using the atoll as a base. The Japanese decided to cancel the reconnaissance flights entirely.

With their supporting mission for the aircraft cancelled, I-175 and I-174 took patrol stations in support of the scheduled invasion of Midway. The Battle of Midway began on 4 June 1942, and it ended on 7 June 1942 in a decisive Japanese defeat. The Japanese cancelled the invasion of Midway. I-175 made no contact with enemy forces during the battle and concluded her patrol with her arrival at Kwajalein on 20 June 1942.

Fourth war patrol
On 8 July 1942, I-175 set out from Kwajalein on her fourth war patrol, assigned a patrol area in the Tasman Sea off the eastern coast of Australia between Sydney and 35 degrees South. She arrived off Sydney on 20 July 1942. As Allara — which was on a voyage from Cairns, Queensland, to Sydney with a cargo of sugar — began to settle by the stern, her crew abandoned ship. She did not sink, however, and eventually she was reboarded and towed to Newcastle.

On 26 July 1942, she survived a depth-charge attack by the Royal Australian Navy corvette , then moved southward.

At 01:30, she fired a  round which missed but prompted the surprised Dureenbee to transmit a distress signal. She then opened fire with machine guns, destroying Dureenbee′s radio room and badly wounding her radio operator. I-175′s next two  shells hit Dureenbee, destroying her wheel house and crippling her steam engine, causing her to go dead in the water. I-175 circled Dureenbee for the next 45 minutes, firing her deck gun, before submerging. She resurfaced six minutes later and departed to seaward, leaving the crippled Dureenbee with one crewman dead and two others seriously wounded, both of whom later died of their injuries. A Royal Australian Air Force aircraft sighted Dureenbee at 06:20, and the Australian fishing trawler Mirrabooka with embarked members of the Australian Volunteer Defence Corps later arrived and took off Dureenbee′s crew. On 4 August 1942, Mirrabooka found the abandoned Dureenbee aground on rocks on the coast of New South Wales off the North Head of Batemans Bay, but attempts to tow her off failed and salvage attempts were abandoned. During and after World War II, some authors described I-175′s attack on the unarmed Dureenbee as a war crime, but in fact Allied submarines made similar attacks on Japanese fishing vessels throughout the war as a way of attacking Japan's war economy and because such vessels sometimes served as early-warning pickets for Japanese military forces.

On 5 August 1942, I-175 arrived in a new patrol area south of Jervis Bay on the coast of New South Wales. On 7 August 1942, however, the Guadalcanal campaign began with United States Marine Corps landings on Guadalcanal in the southeastern Solomon Islands, and that day I-175 received orders to move to an area west of San Cristobal in the southeastern Solomons. She made her transit via the Nouméa area in New Caledonia.

She submerged, but not before suffering bomb damage. Two destroyers —  and  — were detached from Saratoga′s escort screen in Task Force 11 and forced her to remain submerged until dark, when she finally escaped. She headed for Rabaul on New Ireland in the Bismarck Archipelago for emergency repairs, arriving there on 17 August 1942.

Fifth war patrol
I-175 departed Rabaul for to begin her fifth war patrol on 22 August 1942, assigned a patrol area southeast of Guadalcanal extending from the Rennell Island area eastward to the waters southeast of San Cristobal. She reconnoitered the anchorage at Lungga Roads off Lungga Point on the north coast of Guadalcanal on 11 September 1942. The patrol otherwise was uneventful, and she concluded it with her arrival at Truk Atoll in the Caroline Islands on 21 September 1942.

Sixth war patrol
On 16 October 1942, I-175 got underway from Truk for her sixth war patrol, ordered to form a patrol line with I-174 and patrol an area in the Solomon Islands southeast of the Indispensable Reefs and Shortland Islands.

November 1942–May 1943
On 20 November 1942, I-175 suffered damage in an anchorage in Truk Lagoon south of Eten Island (known to the Japanese as "Takeshima") in a collision with the 16,764-gross register ton oiler Nisshin Maru and was run aground to prevent her from sinking. After she was refloated, I-175 departed Truk on 27 November 1942 bound for Kure, Japan, which she reached on 4 December 1942. She moved to Yokosuka, Japan, on 5 December 1942 for repairs. During her stay in Yokosuka, Submarine Division 11 was disbanded on 15 March 1943 and she was reassigned to Submarine Division 12, also in Submarine Squadron 3.

Aleutian Islands campaign

As I-175′s repairs were being completed, Japan's fortunes in the Aleutian Islands campaign waned as United States Army forces landed on Attu in the Aleutian Islands on 11 May 1943, beginning the Battle of Attu. As the fighting on Attu raged, I-175 put to sea from Kure on 17 May 1943 to support Japanese forces in the Aleutians. The Battle of Attu concluded on 30 May 1943 with the annihilation of  the Japanese garrison before the counter-landing could take place. I-175 proceeded to Paramushiro in the northern Kurile Islands.

On  5 June 1943, I-175 departed Paramushiro on a supply run to Kiska, where she unloaded one ton of ammunition and 15 tons of food and embarked 60 passengers. She then returned to Paramushiro, where she arrived on 10 June 1943 and refueled from the oiler  on 11 June 1943. On 13 June 1943 she began another run to Kiska, calling there on 17 June to deliver 16 tons of supplies and embark 70 passengers, and returning to Paramushiro on 20 June 1943.

While she was on patrol, the Japanese evacuated their garrison on Kiska on 28 July 1943. She made no contact with enemy forces and concluded the patrol by heading back to Japan, arriving at Kure on 10 August 1943.

Ninth war patrol: USS Liscome Bay

I-175 got underway from Kure on 19 September 1943 and arrived at Truk on 25 September. She departed Truk on 16 October 1943 to begin her ninth war patrol, assigned a patrol area in the vicinity of Wake Island.

I-175 was heading back to Truk on 20 November 1943 when the U.S. offensive phase of the Gilbert and Marshall Islands campaign began on 20 November 1943 with the U.S. landings on Tarawa, beginning the Battle of Tarawa, and on Butaritari (erroneously referred to as "Makin Atoll" by U.S. forces), beginning the Battle of Makin, and she received orders to make for Butaritari at flank speed. She submerged and avoided an attack by U.S. forces. She continued her approach, and at 05:10 fired four torpedoes at the task force. Two of them missed the escort carrier , but one hit the escort carrier , which was making  and preparing to launch aircraft. It struck Liscome Bay on her starboard aft of her after engine room, detonating her bomb storage magazine. At 05:24, the destroyer  gained sound contact on I-175 and attacked her with depth charges at 05:34.

The destroyer  and other destroyers rescued Liscome Bay′s 272 survivors.

On 26 November 1943, I-175 transmitted a report that she had survived a six-hour counterattack on 24 November by two destroyers which had dropped 34 depth charges, six of which had detonated close aboard. She claimed three Type 95 torpedo hits on an aircraft carrier which probably had sunk. On 27 November 1943, she reported that the depth charges had inflicted damage that limited her diving depth. After calling at Kwajalein overnight on 27–28 November 1943 to refuel, she proceeded to Truk, which she reached on 1 December 1943. Her commanding officer  received a personal citation on 8 January 1944 from the commander of the 6th Fleet, Vice Admiral Takeo Takagi.

Tenth war patrol

I-175 got underway from Truk on 27 January 1944 with the commander of Submarine Division 12 embarked to begin her tenth war patrol, making for a patrol area northeast of the Marshall Islands. While she was at sea, the next phase of the Gilbert and Marshall Islands campaign began when U.S. forces landed on Kwajalein and Roi-Namur (beginning the Battle of Kwajalein) and on Majuro. The same day, I-175 and the submarine  received orders to proceed to Wotje Atoll in the Marshalls at flank speed. On 3 February 1944, I-175 reconnoitered Wotje Atoll.

Loss
Ordered to detach from the screen and investigate, the destroyer  closed with the contact. Charrette achieved sonar contact on the submarine and at 00:03 on 4  February 1944 dropped eight depth charges before losing contact. Ordered to assist Charrette, the destroyer escort  arrived on the scene and at 00:40 fired a salvo of 10 Hedgehog projectiles.

On 26 March 1944, the Imperial Japanese Navy declared I-175 to be presumed lost with all 100 hands in the Kwajalein area. The Japanese struck her from the Navy List on 10 July 1944.

Notes

References
 
 

 
 

Type KD6 submarines
Kaidai-class submarines
Ships built by Mitsubishi Heavy Industries
1937 ships
World War II submarines of Japan
Attack on Pearl Harbor
Ships of the Battle of Midway
Maritime incidents in November 1942
Ships of the Aleutian Islands campaign
World War II shipwrecks in the Pacific Ocean
Japanese submarines lost during World War II
Maritime incidents in February 1944
Ships lost with all hands
Submarines sunk by United States warships